Shirley Netherway married name Shirley Parker (19 May 1937 – 6 March 2016) was a British fencer.

Fencing career
She competed at the 1960 and 1964 Summer Olympics.

After she married in 1965 she competed as Shirley Parker and represented England and won a gold medal in the team foil and a silver medal in the individual foil, at the 1966 British Empire and Commonwealth Games in Kingston, Jamaica.

References

1937 births
2016 deaths
British female foil fencers
Olympic fencers of Great Britain
Fencers at the 1960 Summer Olympics
Fencers at the 1964 Summer Olympics
Commonwealth Games medallists in fencing
Commonwealth Games gold medallists for England
Commonwealth Games silver medallists for England
Fencers at the 1966 British Empire and Commonwealth Games
Medallists at the 1966 British Empire and Commonwealth Games